Events from the year 1227 in Ireland.

Incumbent
Lord: Henry III

Events
The port of New Ross granted trading concessions from Henry III.

Deaths
Luke Netterville (Lucas de Nutrevilla), an Anglo-Norman churchman and archbishop of Armagh

References

 
1220s in Ireland
Ireland
Years of the 13th century in Ireland